The 2014 Cork Junior A Hurling Championship was the 117th staging of the Cork Junior A Hurling Championship since its establishment by the Cork County Board in 1895. The championship began on 20 September 2014 and ended on 26 October 2014.

On 26 October 2014, Castlemartyr won the championship following an 0-18 to 0-10 defeat of Ballinhassig in the final. This was their third championship title in the grade and their first since 1964.

Castlemartyr's Barry Lawton was the championship's top scorer with 0-40.

Qualification

Results

First round

Semi-finals

Final

Championship statistics

Top scorers

Overall

In a single game

References

External link
 2014 JAHC results

Cork Junior Hurling Championship
Cork Junior Hurling Championship